The original version of Windows 10 (also retroactively named version 1507 and codenamed "Threshold 1") was released in July 2015. It carries the build number 10.0.10240; while Microsoft has stated that there was no designated release to manufacturing (RTM) build of Windows 10, build 10240 was described as an RTM build by various media outlets. It was retroactively named "version 1507" by Microsoft per its naming conventions that have the last 2 digits of the year and the month number for future stable releases of the operating system.

Version history
Notable changes in this version include:

An updated start menu
The introduction of Cortana, a virtual assistant, to the desktop version of Windows
A "Continuum" mode that allows users to switch between desktop mode and tablet mode
"Action Center", which includes notifications and quick access to settings
A new web browser, Microsoft Edge, that replaces Internet Explorer as the default browser in Windows
Improved multitasking, including virtual desktops
Many updated built-in apps

The final release was made available to Windows Insiders on July 15, 2015, followed by a public release on July 29, 2015. Support of version 1507 ended on May 9, 2017 for devices in the Current Branch and Current Branch for Business.

See also
Windows 10 version history

References

Windows 10
History of Microsoft
Software version histories